Austria competed at the 1956 Winter Olympics in Cortina d'Ampezzo, Italy.

Medalists

Alpine skiing

Men

Women

Bobsleigh

Cross-country skiing

Men

Men's 4 × 10 km relay

Figure skating

Men

Women

Pairs

Ice hockey

Group A
Top two teams advanced to Medal Round.

Italy 2-2 Austria
Canada 23-0 Austria
Germany (UTG) 7-0 Austria

Games for 7th-10th places

Switzerland 7-4 Austria
Italy 8-2 Austria
Poland 4-3 Austria

Nordic combined 

Events:
 normal hill ski jumping (Three jumps, best two counted and shown here.)
 15 km cross-country skiing

Ski jumping

Speed skating

Men

References
Official Olympic Reports
International Olympic Committee results database
 Olympic Winter Games 1956, full results by sports-reference.com

Nations at the 1956 Winter Olympics
1956
Winter Olympics